Clivipollia incarnata is a species of sea snail, a marine gastropod mollusk in the family Prodotiidae.

Description

Distribution

References

 Drivas, J.; Jay, M. (1987). Coquillages de La Réunion et de l'Île Maurice. Collection Les Beautés de la Nature. Delachaux et Niestlé: Neuchâtel. . 159 pp
 Steyn, D.G. & Lussi, M. (1998) Marine Shells of South Africa. An Illustrated Collector's Guide to Beached Shells. Ekogilde Publishers, Hartebeespoort, South Africa, ii + 264 pp.
 Fraussen K. & Stahlschmidt P. (2016). Revision of the Clivipollia group (Gastropoda: Buccinidae: Pisaniinae) with description of two new genera and three new species. Novapex. 17(2-3): 29–46.
 Liu J.Y. [Ruiyu] (ed.). (2008). Checklist of marine biota of China seas. China Science Press. 1267 pp.
 Snyder M.A. & Callomon P. (2010) Tapparone-Canefri's type material of fasciolariid Gastropoda (Mollusca) at the Genoa Natural History Museum. Proceedings of the Academy of Natural Sciences of Philadelphia 159: 31–38.

External links
 Deshayes G.P. (1834 ["1830"]). [Coquilles de la Mer Rouge] in L. de Laborde, Voyage de l'Arabie Pétrée par Léon de Laborde et Linant. Giard, Paris. 87 pp, 69 pl., 2 maps.

Prodotiidae
Gastropods described in 1830